The 2001 Asian Judo Championships were held in Ulaanbaatar, Mongolia from 14 April to 15 April 2001.

Medal summary

Men

Women

Medal table

External links
 
 Result of the Asian Judo Championships (Judo Union of Asia)

Asian Judo Championships
Asian Championships
IJF World Tour Ulaanbaatar
Judo
Asian 2001
Asian Judo Championships
International sports competitions hosted by Mongolia
21st century in Ulaanbaatar
Judo